Mary Cynthia Walsh  (born May 13, 1952) is a Canadian actress, comedian, and writer. She is known for her work on CODCO and This Hour Has 22 Minutes.

Early life 
Walsh was born in St. John's, Newfoundland and Labrador, the daughter of Mary and Leo Walsh. Leo was a merchant marine turned firefighter on commercial vessels. She is the seventh of eight children, and is of Irish ancestry. She is a past member of Girl Guides of Canada.

Career
Walsh studied theatre in Toronto at Ryerson University but dropped out to work with the CODCO comedy troupe on a series of stage shows, which eventually evolved into a sketch comedy series. The CODCO series ran from 1988 to 1993 on CBC Television.

This Hour Has 22 Minutes
In 1992, she began to work with former co-star Rick Mercer and former CODCO co-stars Cathy Jones and Greg Thomey to create a new television series called This Hour Has 22 Minutes. The show was a parody of the nightly news, and poked fun at Canadian and international politics. 22 Minutes received strong ratings during its earlier seasons and Walsh's character Marg Delahunty became famous for buttonholing politicians and submitting them to satirical interviews. Usually Marg Delahunty would recite a scripted piece intended to humiliate the politician, often by providing criticism and "grandmotherly" advice. Sometimes Marg appeared as "Marg, Princess Warrior", a parody of the title character of Xena: Warrior Princess portrayed by Lucy Lawless. Walsh is also noted for her comical segment chronicling the  Canadian Auto Workers Union's tense blockade of the Volvo Halifax Assembly plant in 1998. In 2007, she revived Marg Delahunty for the Royal Canadian Air Farce's 300th episode. On October 24, 2011, Walsh was once again in the spotlight as she reprised the role of Marg Delahunty conducting an ambush interview of Toronto Mayor Rob Ford at his home. Ford's reaction and alleged verbal abuse directed at a 911 operator made national headlines. She also reprised Marg, Princess Warrior for an episode of the 25th season of 22 Minutes in December 2017.

In 2020, Walsh reprised her longtime 22 Minutes character of Miss Eulalia in the CBC Gem web series Broad Appeal: Living with E's, for which she received a Canadian Screen Award nomination for Best Lead Performance in a Web Program or Series at the 10th Canadian Screen Awards in 2022.

Other work 
Walsh's other television work included the short-run sitcoms Dooley Gardens (1999); Hatching, Matching and Dispatching (2006); and a guest starring role as Miranda Cahill on the CBC television series Republic of Doyle. She currently has a recurring role on CBC's Little Dog.  She created the CBC program Mary Walsh: Open Book, a talk show about books and literature, in 2003. Walsh revived the Fury family from Hatching, Matching, and Dispatching by writing and starring in A Christmas Fury in 2017.

Besides TV acting, she has worked on movies such as Mambo Italiano, Geraldine's Fortune, Rain, Drizzle and Fog, Buried on Sunday, The Divine Ryans, Young Triffie, Violet, and The Grand Seduction.

2004 saw Walsh host a segment on the CBC documentary series The Greatest Canadian, in which she championed the case for Sir Frederick Banting (the Nobel prize-winning discoverer of insulin) as the greatest Canadian who ever lived.

In June 2007, she hosted the Pride Toronto Gala & Awards ceremony.

On December 15, 2007, Walsh made national news with a story about her upcoming special, Nudity, Sexuality, Violence and Coarse Language, in which a large group of people who went and stripped naked standing next to St. John's Harbour in −11 °C (12 °F) weather to be filmed as a part of the show's closing. Walsh herself did not go nude.

In 2017, Walsh published her debut novel, Crying for the Moon.

Directing
Walsh made her feature directorial debut with the 2007 movie Young Triffie. She was the first Newfoundlander in six years to have a film in general release across Canada.

Personal life
Walsh has battled alcoholism. The Toronto Star reported that the end of CODCO coincided with the end of Walsh's active alcoholism, with Walsh stating "which was a damn good thing because I could have never done This Hour Has 22 Minutes if I'd been drinking."

Honours

Performing arts
She won Best Supporting Actress at the Atlantic Film Festival in 1992 for her performance in Mike Jones' Secret Nation.

On November 4, 2006, Walsh and Ed MacDonald picked up a Gemini Award for the best writing in a comedy or variety program for their work in Hatching, Matching and Dispatching.

She has won 18 Gemini Awards. She won the Canadian Screen Award for Best Supporting Actress at the 9th Canadian Screen Awards in 2021, for the film Happy Place.

Walsh received a Governor General's Performing Arts Award for Lifetime Artistic Achievement, Canada's highest honour in the performing arts, in 2012.

Charity and activism
A sufferer of macular degeneration, she has served from time to time as a spokesperson for the Canadian National Institute for the Blind (CNIB).

In 1993, Walsh was chosen to deliver the prestigious Graham Spry lecture which was broadcast nationally on CBC Radio.

In 1994, Walsh addressed the United Nations Global Conference on Development in New York. She has also served as a spokesperson for Oxfam, Canada's human rights campaign, and in 2010 received Oxfam's Spirit of Change Award, in recognition of her years of dedication to eradicating poverty and ensuring public services for all.

On May 29, 1998, Mary Walsh received an Honorary Doctor of Laws from Trent University.

McGill University honoured Walsh with an honorary doctorate during the November 2008 convocation ceremony. Her speech to the class of 2008 focused on political satire.

Filmography

Film

Television

Bibliography
Crying for the Moon: A Novel (April 18, 2017 HarperCollins)

References

External links 

1952 births
Living people
Canadian film actresses
Canadian stage actresses
Canadian television actresses
Canadian television personalities
Canadian Screen Award winners
Members of the Order of Canada
Actresses from Newfoundland and Labrador
Canadian women comedians
This Hour Has 22 Minutes
Governor General's Performing Arts Award winners
Canadian sketch comedians
20th-century Canadian actresses
21st-century Canadian actresses
Canadian people of Irish descent
Canadian women novelists
21st-century Canadian novelists
Writers from St. John's, Newfoundland and Labrador
21st-century Canadian women writers
Canadian women television personalities
Comedians from Newfoundland and Labrador
Best Supporting Actress Genie and Canadian Screen Award winners
Canadian Comedy Award winners
Film producers from Newfoundland and Labrador
Canadian women film producers
Canadian television producers
Canadian women television producers